"Wacky Dust" is a 1938 song by Ella Fitzgerald with the Chick Webb orchestra written by Oscar Levant and Stanley Adams. It is an uptempo song about the joys (and dangers) of taking cocaine. It is also included on the Swingsation album of Ella Fitzgerald songs released on 16 June 1998 which were all recorded in New York City between September 1934 and February 1939. The song features on the compilation CD Reefer Songs.

The song was covered by The Manhattan Transfer on their 1979 album Extensions.

External links

1938 songs
Ella Fitzgerald songs
Songs about cocaine
Songs written by Stanley Adams (singer)
Songs written by Oscar Levant